The Brunsbüttel Nuclear Power Plant is a nuclear power plant in Brunsbüttel near Hamburg, Germany. It is owned 67% by Vattenfall and 33% by E.ON. It started operation in 1976 and has a gross power production of 806 MW. During its lifetime, it produced 130,000 GW hours of electricity. The value of this electricity is about 9.1 billion Euros before calculation of the nuclear waste management.

As part of the nuclear power phase-out, it was taken out of service in 2007.

References

External links

Former nuclear power stations in Germany
Buildings and structures in Schleswig-Holstein
Economy of Schleswig-Holstein
Vattenfall nuclear power stations